Look at the Birdie is a collection of fourteen previously unpublished short stories by Kurt Vonnegut, released on October 20, 2009.  It is the second posthumously published Kurt Vonnegut book, the first being Armageddon in Retrospect.

Contents
 Letter from Kurt Vonnegut, Jr., to Walter J. Miller, 1951.
 "Confido"
 "F U B A R"
 "Shout About It from the Housetops"
 "Ed Luby's Key Club"
 "A Song for Selma"
 "Hall of Mirrors"
 "The Nice Little People"
 "Hello, Red"
 "Little Drops of Water"
 "The Petrified Ants"
 "The Honor of a Newsboy"
 "Look at the Birdie"
 "King and Queen of the Universe"
 "The Good Explainer"

External links
"Look at the Birdie", the Los Angeles Times October 18, 2009 (Full text of the story "Look at the Birdie")

2009 short story collections
Books published posthumously
Short story collections by Kurt Vonnegut